NGC 423 is a lenticular galaxy of type S0/a? located in the constellation Sculptor. It was discovered on November 14, 1835 by John Herschel. It was described by Dreyer as "extremely faint, small, extended, gradually a little brighter middle, eastern of 2.", the other being NGC 418.

References

External links
 

0423
18351114
Sculptor (constellation)
Lenticular galaxies
004266